The Copa del Rey  1911 was the 10th staging of the Copa del Rey, the Spanish football cup competition.

The competition started on 9 April 1911, and concluded on 15 April 1911, with the final, held at the Josaleta Stadium in Getxo, in which Athletic Bilbao lifted the trophy for the 5th time ever with a 3–1 victory over CD Español. The Bilbao goals were scored by Martyn Veitch, Luis Belaunde and Manuel Guernica.

This tournament had 13 teams enter, but three teams withdrew before it started, and another three teams withdrew during the competition.

Controversies
RC Deportivo de la Coruña and Academia de Ingenieros withdrew before the draw to protest fielding foreign players in the tournament. 

During the tournament, there were more protests and withdrawal threats from some teams. 

After the first round match between Athletic Bilbao and Fortuna Vigo, Real Sociedad protested the match, claiming the illegal selection of two English players in Athletic's side: the Spanish FA rejected the protest and Real Sociedad withdrew in protest. After the remaining teams supported Real Sociedad and most of them threatened to also withdraw, Athletic decided not to use these players in their matches, but declined Fortuna Vigo's request to replay their match.

This dispute was a major factor in Athletic Bilbao's decision to select only local Basque players from then on, a club policy which survived into the 21st century.

Preliminary round

Quarterfinals

Semifinals

Final

References

External links
LinguaSport.com
RSSSF.com

1911
1911 domestic association football cups
1910–11 in Spanish football